Local (Polish: Tutejszy, ; ; ; ;) was a self-identification of Eastern European rural populations, who did not have a clear national identity. This was mostly in mixed-lingual Eastern European areas, including Poland, Ukraine, Belarus, Lithuania, and Latvia, in particular, in Polesia and Podlachia. As a self-identification, it persisted in Lithuania’s Vilnius Region into the late 20th century. For example, in 1989, a poll of persons whose passports recorded their ethnicity as Polish revealed that 4% of them regarded themselves as Locals, 10% as Lithuanians, and 84% as Poles.

In Poland 
The term was first used in an official publication in 1922  in the preliminary results of the Polish census of 1921  (Miesięcznik Statystyczny, vol. V). An indigenous nationality was declared by 38,943 persons, with the vast majority being Orthodox (38,135) and from rural areas (36,729). The Census stated that this category was for "population who could not describe their ethnicity in any other way". This census did not include the Vilnius Region.

There are mixed opinions about the reasons, meaning, and implications of this term. In the Polish census of 1931 asked respondents to identify their mother tongue. “Tutejszy” was included and was chosen by 707,000 respondents. Lithuanian researchers assert that within ethnographic Lithuania, the Tutejszy were mostly Slavicized Lithuanians.  argues that a considerable contribution to Slavicization of the area was a significant influx of Ruthenian (Belarusian) peasantry in the area, especially after considerable depopulation due to plague.

In Latvia 
Report on the Latvian census of 1930 describes tuteiši as Catholics of Latgale, who spoke Polish, Latvian and Russian equally and lacked ethnic identity (the Latvian census did not recognize these people as having a separate ethnic identity). The report notes that they could easily change their identity on a whim or after being persuaded by nationalist organizations, producing sharp changes in the ethnic composition of some areas, the most noticeable changes being a decrease in the number of Belarusians in ten years since 1920 from 75,630 to 36,029 and number of Poles increasing more than could be explained with natural growth and immigration, suggesting that some 5,000 Tutejszy had chosen to identify as Poles. In addition, uncertain number of them presumably chose to identify as Russians or Latvians.

Language 

See also
Poleshuks
Podlashuks
Kresy
Krajowcy
Simple speech

References

Bibliography 

 

Ethnic groups in Poland
Ethnic groups in Belarus
Ethnic groups in Ukraine
Ethnic groups in Lithuania
Demographic history of Poland